Sarah Lovett may refer to:

Sarah Lovett, sometimes identified as the name of Mrs. Lovett
Sarah Lovett (playwright) in Padua Playwrights